The St. Louis Browns 1883 season was the team's second season in St. Louis, Missouri and its second season in the American Association. The Browns went 65–33 during the season and finished second in the American Association.

Regular season

Season standings

Record vs. opponents

Roster

Player stats

Batting

Starters by position
Pos=Position, G=Games played, AB=At bats, R=Runs scored, H=Hits, 2B=Doubles, 3B=Triples, Avg=Batting average, HR=Home runs, RBI=Runs batted in, BB=Base on balls, Slg=Slugging percentage

Other batters
G=Games played, AB=At bats, R=Runs scored, H=Hits, 2B=Doubles, 3B=Triples, Avg.=Batting average, HR=Home runs, RBI=Runs batted in, BB=Base on balls, Slg=Slugging percentage

Pitching

Starting pitchers
Note: G = Games pitched; IP = Innings pitched; W = Wins; L = Losses; ERA = Earned run average; SO = Strikeouts

Relief pitchers
Note: G = Games pitched; W = Wins; L = Losses; SV = Saves; ERA = Earned run average; SO = Strikeouts

External links
1883 St. Louis Browns at Baseball Reference
1883 St. Louis Browns team page at www.baseball-almanac.com

St. Louis Cardinals seasons
Saint Louis Browns season
St Louis